Guido Antonius Gerardus Alkemade (born 23 June 1962 in Leiden) is a sailor from the Netherlands, who represented his country at the 1984 Summer Olympics in Los Angeles. With John Stavenuiter as helmsman, Alkemade took the 9th place in the 470. Four years later Alkemade returned as substitute, for the Dutch 470, to the 1988 Summer Olympics.

Professional life
After the Olympics Alkemade and Huub Lambriex started their own company, (1984) in yacht equipment, LA84, specialized in ropes. After the sale of the company (2006), to On Deck and Beyond, Alkemade held the following positions:
 Consultant On Deck and Beyond (2006–2007)
 Coach :nl:ROC Leiden (2007–2008)
 Coach Team Heiner (2008–Present)

Sources
 
 
 
 
 
 
 
 
 
 
 
 
 
 
 
 
 
 
 
 
 
 
 
 
 

1962 births
Living people
Dutch male sailors (sport)
Sportspeople from Leiden
Sailors at the 1984 Summer Olympics – 470
Olympic sailors of the Netherlands
Medalists at the 1984 Summer Olympics
Olympic medalists in sailing
Olympic bronze medalists for the Netherlands
Erasmus University Rotterdam alumni
20th-century Dutch people